Glinka is the name of several rural localities in Russia:
Glinka, Altai Krai, a settlement in Nikolsky Selsoviet of Sovetsky District of Altai Krai
Glinka, Bryansk Oblast, a village in Seshchensky Selsoviet of Dubrovsky District of Bryansk Oblast
Glinka, Chelyabinsk Oblast, a village in Voznesensky Selsoviet of Sosnovsky District of Chelyabinsk Oblast
Glinka, Krasnoyarsk Krai, a village in Novoaltatsky Selsoviet of Sharypovsky District of Krasnoyarsk Krai
Glinka, Leningrad Oblast, a village in Fedorovskoye Settlement Municipal Formation of Tosnensky District of Leningrad Oblast
Glinka, Oryol Oblast, a village in Korsunsky Selsoviet of Verkhovsky District of Oryol Oblast
Glinka, Smolensk Oblast, a selo in Glinkovskoye Rural Settlement of Glinkovsky District of Smolensk Oblast
Glinka, Yaroslavl Oblast, a village in Selishchensky Rural Okrug of Borisoglebsky District of Yaroslavl Oblast
Glinka, Zabaykalsky Krai, a selo in Khiloksky District of Zabaykalsky Krai